Stephen King's Desperation is a 2006 American horror television film based on Stephen King's 1996 novel of the same name. King himself wrote the teleplay. The film was directed by frequent King collaborator Mick Garris and stars Ron Perlman, Tom Skerritt, Steven Weber and Annabeth Gish.

Plot
In the Nevada desert, a couple, Peter and Mary Jackson, are driving just as a sheriff, Collie Entragian, stops them. He soon learns they possess marijuana, though Entragian may have planted it. He takes them to jail. After entering the police station, they see a little girl dead on the floor, and Entragian shoots and kills Peter. Mary is thrown in a jail cell along with a young boy, David Carver, his parents, Ralph and Ellen, and an old man, Tom Billingsley. The little girl is the Carver's daughter, named Pie. In the meantime, in the police station, David kneels and prays to God, his practice since a drunk driver struck his best friend, Brian.

Meanwhile, Steve Ames is in his truck, following famous author Johnny Marinville. Ames is Marinville's assistant. Steve soon picks up a young female hitchhiker named Cynthia Smith. Johnny stops in the desert to urinate just as Entragian shows up behind him and plants the same bag of marijuana he got from Peter and Mary in Johnny's motorcycle bag and arrests him.

Back in the Police Station, his mother, Ellen, asks David why he kept on praying. David revealed that he prays because God made "his" presence known to him by miraculously saving his friend Brian from the brink of death. He then recollects that a drunk driver hit Brian when he and Brian were riding a bike. David immediately began praying to God, offering to sacrifice anything and to do whatever was asked of him so that his friend be saved. At that point, Brian miraculously regained consciousness. The doctor at the hospital described Brian's recovery as "miraculous."

Later, David realizes Entragian's skin is breaking out, and he keeps saying "Tak" because he is possessed. Entragian then takes Ellen so he can shift his spirit into her body. He leaves his vicious dog to guard the cells. Pie's ghost appears and gives David a bar of soap which glows green. David scrubs his body with the soap and, while the dog is distracted, slips through the bars of the jail cell and escapes the holding area. David searches the police station and finds a gun on the corpse of another sheriff. He returns and shoots the guard dog, freeing everyone.

Meanwhile, Steve drives up to where Entragian captured Johnny. He and Cynthia find Johnny's motorcycle hidden behind dry bushes. Cynthia and Steve later search the town, finding all the residents dead. They both meet up with other escaped prisoners from the jail that night. They gather at a disused theater, and Tom tells a story that took place 120 years ago when Chinese workers digging in a local mine known as 'The China Pit' discovered an evil spirit named "Tak." The now-possessed Ellen sends in a mountain lion, killing Tom. Ellen then takes Mary so that Tak can have a new body.

David sees Pie's ghost in the theater again. She leads him to the movie editing machine, where old footage (apparently supernatural/visionary) reveals the truth of how Tak came to the town. Mary wakes up to find herself trapped in a shed, surrounded by rattlesnakes, scorpions, and tarantulas, waiting to be the next host for Tak. With the help of Pie, she manages to escape while seriously injuring Ellen's body. Tak is forced to take over the body of a buzzard.

Johnny later confesses that 40 years ago in Vietnam, he saw a guy possessed by Tak blow up the bathroom of a bar, killing 87 people. Johnny still feels guilty that he did not warn any of the patrons before fleeing the bar. The group decides to return to the cave with some explosives they found to put an end to Tak. At the entrance, the buzzard comes out and kills Ralph. In order to redeem himself, Johnny goes into the mine and falls in a hole leading to a pit where Tak is. Johnny ignites the explosives, blowing up the mine and giving up his life, while the rest of the survivors drive away in Steve's truck.

Along the route driving away from the town, they pass by the empty RV vehicle owned by David's family and Peter's sister's car. Mary tells Steve to stop the truck to retrieve an overnight case from the car. In the back seat, Mary finds a photo album belonging to David with a frontispiece picture of Johnny and Pie together, which Steve identifies as being signed by Johnny.

Cast
 Tom Skerritt as Johnny Marinville – A famous author who was in Vietnam when he was young
 Tom Parker as Young Johnny
 Ron Perlman as Collie Entragian – The sheriff of the town of Desperation, already possessed by Tak at the start of the movie
 Steven Weber as Steve Ames – A man who works for Johnny
 Annabeth Gish as Mary Jackson – Peter’s wife
 Charles Durning as Tom Billingsley – An old veterinarian who lives in the town
 Shane Haboucha as David Carver – A boy who talks to God
 Matt Frewer as Ralph Carver – David's father
 Kelly Overton as Cynthia Smith – Female hitchhiker
 Henry Thomas as Peter Jackson – Mary’s husband
 Sylvia Kelegian as Ellen Carver – David's mother
 Sammi Hanratty as Pie Carver – David's deceased sister
 Ewan Chung as Shih – Chinese miner, brother to Cha'an
 Alain Uy as Cha'an – Chinese miner, brother to Shih
 Trieu Tran as Young Viet Cong

Production
The film was produced in 2004, though it was not released until 2006. Filming primarily took place in Bisbee, Arizona, in the nearly deserted Lowell borough, with other sequences in Old Bisbee, the outskirts of Bisbee and Tucson, Arizona. During filming, a set in the Tucson Convention Center (TCC) caught fire. Five people were injured. The fire destroyed everything on the set, including all production gear and equipment, and the TCC was heavily damaged.

Release and reception
The film was first broadcast in the United States on May 23, 2006, followed by its DVD release in the United States on August 29 of the same year. The film received moderately favourable reviews, including a 46 rating from Metacritic. Though originally intended as a two-part miniseries, Desperation aired in its entirety on May 23, 2006, on ABC, after a red-carpet premiere screening at Tucson's historic Fox Theatre (built in 1929). ABC aired Desperation at the same time as Fox's American Idol, an action that King himself was upset with; thus, it did not do that well in the ratings with only 7.5 million viewers.

References

External links
 

2006 horror films
2006 television films
Films based on works by Stephen King
Films set in Nevada
Films shot in Arizona
Films with screenplays by Stephen King
Television shows based on works by Stephen King
2006 films
Films based on American horror novels
American horror television films
American drama television films
American thriller television films
Fantasy television films
Films directed by Mick Garris
2000s American films
Films about cougars